Public Health Nutrition is a monthly peer-reviewed public health journal covering nutrition-related public health topics. It was established in 1998 and is published by Cambridge University Press. The editor-in-chief is Marilyn Tseng (California Polytechnic State University). According to the Journal Citation Reports, the journal has a 2013 impact factor of 2.483.

References

External links

Cambridge University Press academic journals
Publications established in 1998
Monthly journals
English-language journals
Public health journals
Nutrition and dietetics journals